René Schroeder (23 December 1920 – 10 February 2001) was a Luxembourgian gymnast. He competed at the 1948 Summer Olympics and the 1952 Summer Olympics.

References

1920 births
2001 deaths
Luxembourgian male artistic gymnasts
Olympic gymnasts of Luxembourg
Gymnasts at the 1948 Summer Olympics
Gymnasts at the 1952 Summer Olympics
Sportspeople from Esch-sur-Alzette
20th-century Luxembourgian people